LDW may refer to:

Ladhowal railway station, Ludhiana district, Punjab, India
Lane departure warning
Last Day of Work, a video game developer
Lindenwold (NJT station), Amtrak station code
Liu Wei Di Huang Wan, a traditional Chinese medical formula
Logical Design Works, a defunct video game publisher
Loss damage waiver, also called CDW (Collision Damage Waiver)